Thomas Patrick Barrasso (born March 31, 1965) is an American professional ice hockey coach and former professional ice hockey goaltender. He played in the National Hockey League (NHL) for 18 seasons. He began his time in the NHL with the Buffalo Sabres, who selected him fifth overall in the 1983 NHL Entry Draft out of high school. He was traded to the Pittsburgh Penguins in 1988, where he would best be remembered and spend the majority of his career. He spent parts of 12 seasons with the Penguins, and was a Stanley Cup champion in 1991 and 1992. After being traded to the Ottawa Senators in March 2000 and sitting out the 2000–01 season, his final two seasons were split playing for the Carolina Hurricanes, Toronto Maple Leafs, and St. Louis Blues. He was inducted into the United States Hockey Hall of Fame in 2009.

After retiring as a player, Barrasso served on the coaching staff of the NHL's Carolina Hurricanes. In 2012, Barrasso was hired by Metallurg Magnitogorsk of the Kontinental Hockey League (KHL) as a member of its coaching staff. In 2016 he joined Asiago Hockey of the Alps Hockey League as their head coach, winning the 2017–18 league championship. In October 2018, Barrasso was hired as head coach of the EIHL's Sheffield Steelers.

Playing career

Early career
Barrasso grew up in the town of Stow, Massachusetts, playing ice hockey on an outdoor rink. He started playing goaltender at the age of five years and by the time he was a teenager, was playing in net for Acton-Boxborough with fellow NHL players Bob Sweeney and Jeff Norton. Barrasso was considered one of the most promising American goaltending prospects of all time. He was drafted by the Buffalo Sabres with the fifth overall pick in 1983. Skipping a college career, he went straight from high school to the NHL. At the time of his debut with the Sabres on October 5, 1983, less than six months after graduating from high school, Barrasso was the youngest goaltender to play and win a game in the NHL since Harry Lumley nearly forty years prior. He won the Calder Memorial Trophy and Vezina Trophy in his first season, becoming the third player to win both awards in the same year.

Pittsburgh Penguins
On November 12, 1988, the Sabres traded Barrasso, with a third round draft pick in the 1990 draft, (Joe Dziedzic) to the Pittsburgh Penguins for Doug Bodger and Darrin Shannon.

Barrasso won the Stanley Cup twice, in 1991 and 1992. It was his play in these Cup runs that established him as a "money goalie". In the following years, Barrasso almost entirely missed two seasons, the 1994–95 NHL season and the 1996–97 NHL season with injuries but came back with good performances in the next years. In 1997, he became the first American goaltender to record 300 NHL wins. A fiercely proud competitor, in his later seasons in Pittsburgh he developed a strained relationship with the local media, who he felt were disrespectful of him and his family. This probably factors into why his #35 was not retired by the Penguins (current starting goaltender Tristan Jarry currently wears #35), as only Mario Lemieux's and Michel Brière's jerseys are retired, while Jaromír Jágr's number has been removed from circulation with the intent to retire it in the future.

Last years
In March 2000, Barrasso was traded to the Ottawa Senators for Ron Tugnutt and Janne Laukkanen in a deal that was seen as a risk for both teams. He was uneven in Ottawa, going 3–4 in seven starts and losing the first two games of Ottawa's first round series with rivals Toronto before bouncing back and winning the next two games to even the series. After evening the series, Barrasso caused a furor during the CBC's broadcast when he said during an on-air interview that "I really couldn't give a shit what you people have to say". Barrasso would later apologize for using vulgar language, although he stood by his sentiments in the interview, stating the year had been very stressful for him. The Senators would go on to lose the next two games and the series to the Maple Leafs in six games.

After his playoff run with Ottawa, Barrasso's contract expired and he did not to re-sign with the Senators. He then spent the entire 2000–01 season out of hockey and returned with the Carolina Hurricanes in time for the 2001–02 season. He enjoyed some late international success, winning Silver at the 2002 Winter Olympics.

In his last few seasons, Barrasso briefly played for several teams, the Ottawa Senators, the Carolina Hurricanes, the Toronto Maple Leafs, and the St. Louis Blues until retiring from ice hockey in 2003. He signed a pro forma contract with Pittsburgh on the day he declared retirement so he could leave hockey as a Penguin.

International play

Barrasso won an Olympic silver medal as part of the U.S. national men's ice hockey team at the 2002 Winter Games in Salt Lake City.  He played in one game, an 8–1 victory over Belarus on February 18.

Barrasso had originally intended to play for the 1984 U.S. Olympic team in Sarajevo, but chose to begin his professional career instead and left the team in September 1983 to sign with the Sabres.  He made his debut for Team USA at the 1984 Canada Cup, at the age of 19.  He also played in the 1983 World Junior Championships, the 1986 World Ice Hockey Championships and the 1987 Canada Cup.

Coaching career
Barrasso was goaltending coach (2007–09) and later assistant coach (2009–11) of the Carolina Hurricanes. In the 2012–13 season he moved to KHL's Metallurg Magnitogorsk as assistant coach. During the Summer of 2015 Slovan Bratislava hired Barrasso as goaltending coach, but on October 31 he left the team and moved to Italy's Valpellice as head coach. The team won the Coppa Italia, but refused to join the newly founded Alps Hockey League. Barrasso, however, did not leave Italy: he moved to Asiago as head coach. Barrasso was named as head coach of the Sheffield Steelers in the EIHL in October 2018.

On 26 June 2021, Barrasso was named as head coach of HC Varese in the IHL

Personal life
Barrasso and his wife Megan have three daughters, Ashley, Kelsey and Mallory. Barrasso founded the Ashley Barrasso Cancer Research Fund during the early 1990s after his oldest daughter survived a bout with neuroblastoma cancer.

Records
 Most NHL assists by a goaltender (career) – 48
 Most NHL points by a goaltender (career) – 48
 Shares record for most consecutive wins in one NHL regular season – 14 (March 9, 1993 to April 9, 1993)
 Most consecutive NHL playoff wins – 14 (May 9, 1992 to April 22, 1993)
 Shares record for most consecutive wins in one NHL playoff season – 11 in 1992
 Shares record for most wins in one NHL playoff season – 16 (1992)
 Most playoff wins by an American goaltender – 61

Career statistics

Regular season and playoffs

International

Awards and achievements
 1984 – Calder Memorial Trophy (Top rookie in NHL)
 1984 – Vezina Trophy (Top goaltender in NHL)
 1984 – NHL First All-Star Team
 1985 – NHL Second All-Star Team
 1985 – William M. Jennings Trophy (Team with fewest goals allowed – shared with Bob Sauve)
 1985 – Played in NHL All-Star Game
 1991 – Stanley Cup champion (Pittsburgh Penguins)
 1992 – Stanley Cup champion (Pittsburgh Penguins)
 1993 – NHL Second All-Star Team
 #17 all time in Wins in regular season with (369).
 #9 all time in Saves with (22090) in regular season career.
 Tied for 15th alltime in playoff wins (61).
 #3 all time in NHL wins by a US born Goaltender (369) 
 2002 – Olympic ice hockey silver medalist (Team USA)
 2007 – Inducted into the National Italian American Sports Hall of Fame
 2009 – Inducted into the U.S. Hockey Hall of Fame
 2015 – Coppa Italia champion (Hockey Club Valpellice)
 2018 – Alps Hockey League champion (Asiago Hockey AS)
 2003 – Member of the Pittsburgh Penguins Ring of Honor that formerly circled the Pittsburgh Civic Arena

References

External links

Tom Barrasso's profile at Hockeydraftcentral.com

1965 births
American men's ice hockey goaltenders
Buffalo Sabres draft picks
Buffalo Sabres players
Calder Trophy winners
Carolina Hurricanes coaches
Carolina Hurricanes players
Ice hockey players from Massachusetts
Ice hockey players at the 2002 Winter Olympics
Living people
Medalists at the 2002 Winter Olympics
National Hockey League All-Stars
National Hockey League first-round draft picks
Olympic silver medalists for the United States in ice hockey
Ottawa Senators players
People from Stow, Massachusetts
Pittsburgh Penguins players
Rochester Americans players
Sportspeople from Middlesex County, Massachusetts
St. Louis Blues players
Stanley Cup champions
Toronto Maple Leafs players
United States Hockey Hall of Fame inductees
Vezina Trophy winners
William M. Jennings Trophy winners
Ice hockey coaches from Massachusetts